The 1992 UST Growling Tigers men's basketball team represented University of Santo Tomas in the 55th season of the University Athletic Association of the Philippines. The men's basketball tournament for the school year 1992–93 began on July 18, 1992, and the host school for the season was also UST.

The Glowing Goldies who had been renamed the Golden Tigers ended the double round-robin eliminations at fourth place with 10 wins against four losses. UST found themselves grouped in a quadruple tie at first place with the FEU Tamaraws, the De La Salle Green Archers, and the Adamson Falcons with a 10–3 record heading into the last game of the eliminations. They were looking into a Finals berth with a win over FEU. In the game, UST was trailing, 56–68 with 3:47 remaining when a power outage struck the venue, causing game officials to reschedule the remainder of the game. It was resumed three days later with only the last three minutes left to be contested. The Tigers lost, 76–87. They had managed to come within six points in the last 1:15 from a deficit of 63–76, but the Tamaraws clamped them down with their defense forcing the players to miss their shots.

Team captain Udoy Belmonte and Rey Evangelista were selected to the Mythical first team, while Dennis Espino, who missed a few games including the FEU match in the second round made it to the second team. Espino and Patrick Fran were members of the national team that competed at the ABC Junior Championships in Beijing.

Roster

Depth chart

Roster changes

Subtractions

Additions

Schedule and results

Preseason tournaments

UAAP games 

Elimination games were played in a double round-robin format. All games were aired on RPN 9 by Silverstar Sports.

Awards

Players drafted into the PBA 
Rene Cabaluna and Jay Torres, two of the Tigers' roster members were picked in the PBA draft after their stint in this year's UAAP tournament. Cabaluna was selected 22nd overall in the fourth round of the 1994 PBA draft, while Torres was 7th overall in the second round of the 2000 PBA draft.

References 

UST Growling Tigers basketball team seasons